Royal Tea is the fourteenth solo studio album by American blues rock musician Joe Bonamassa released in 2020. It was recorded at Abbey Road Studios. The album was followed by a live release, Now Serving: Royal Tea Live from the Ryman, which includes all songs from Royal Tea except "Savannah".

Royal Tea was nominated for a Grammy Award for Best Contemporary Blues Album for the 64th Annual Grammy Awards in 2022.

Track listing
All songs written by Joe Bonamassa and Bernie Marsden except where noted.
 "When One Door Opens" (Joe Bonamassa, Kevin Shirley, Pete Brown) – 7:35
 "Royal Tea" (James Howe, Bonamassa, Shirley) – 4:29
 "Why Does It Take So Long to Say Goodbye" – 6:45
 "Lookout Man!" (Bonamassa, Shirley, Mike McCully, Brown) – 5:31
 "High Class Girl" – 4:54
 "A Conversation with Alice" – 4:19
 "I Didn't Think She Would Do It" (Marsden, Bonamassa, Brown) – 4:12
 "Beyond the Silence" (Bonamassa) – 6:46
 "Lonely Boy" (Dave Stewart, Bonamassa, Jools Holland) – 4:06
 "Savannah" – 4:38
Target exclusive CD bonus tracks:
 "Don't You Do Me No Favours" – 5:38
 "Don't Hand Me Your Hangups" – 4:13

Personnel
 Joe Bonamassa - vocals and guitar (all tracks), mandolin (10)
 Kevin Shirley - acoustic guitar (3, 4), percussion (4)
 Rob McNelley - rhythm guitar (6, 7)
 Reese Wynans - organ (all tracks), piano (8), Wurlitzer (6, 10)
 Jools Holland - piano (9)
 Michael Rhodes - bass (all tracks)
 Anton Fig - drums (all tracks), percussion (4, 8)
 Greg Morrow - drums and percussion (4)
 Jeff Bova - orchestration (1), percussion (2)
 Lee Thornburg - trumpet and horn arrangement (9)
 Paulie Cerra - saxophone (9)
 Ron Dziubla - baritone saxophone (9)
 Errol Litton - harmonica (4)
 Juanita Tippins - backing vocals (1 to 5)
 Mahalia Barnes - backing vocals (6)
 Jade MacRae - backing vocals (1 to 6)
 Bernie Marsden - backing vocals (10)
 Orchestra - The Bovaland Symphonic Orchestra (1)

References

2020 albums
Albums produced by Kevin Shirley
Joe Bonamassa albums